Read Between the Lies is the first novel by Emmy-winning author, Lori Bryant-Woolridge. Read Between the Lies combines chick lit and "beach book" styles with themes of racial diversity and adult illiteracy.

References

1999 American novels
Chick lit novels
1999 debut novels